Dino Felicetti (born December 12, 1970) is an Italian-Canadian retired professional ice hockey winger.

Achievements
2005 – Scoring leader in the 2005 Division IB world championship. 
2006 - Serie A Champion with HC Milano

International play
Dino Felicetti played in the Olympics in 1998.  Additionally he represented Italy in the World Championships six times.

References

External links
 

1970 births
Living people
Canadian ice hockey forwards
Canadian people of Italian descent
Hamilton Dukes players
Ice hockey players at the 1998 Winter Olympics
Olympic ice hockey players of Italy
Sportspeople from Burlington, Ontario
Ice hockey people from Ontario
Italian ice hockey players
SHC Fassa players
Canadian expatriate ice hockey players in Italy